The Maneri Dam is a concrete gravity dam on the Bhagirathi River located at Maneri,  east of Uttarkashi in Uttarkashi district, Uttarakhand, India. The primary purpose of the dam is to divert water into a tunnel which feeds the  run-of-the-river Tiloth Power Plant.

Background
The power station is stage one of the Maneri Bhali Hydroelectric Project which was planned in the 1960s. It was completed and commissioned in 1984. Dharasu Power Station, the second stage, was halted in 1990 due to funding issues and was not restarted until 2002. It was eventually completed and commissioned by 2008.

Design and operation
It's spillway is located on its crest and is controlled by four tainter gates. Near the Tiloth Power Plant, the tunnel splits into three penstocks to power each of the three 30 MW Francis turbine-generators before being discharged back into the river.

See also

List of power stations in India

References

Dams completed in 1984
Dams in Uttarakhand
Gravity dams
Uttarkashi district
Dams on the Bhagirathi River
Energy infrastructure completed in 1984
1984 establishments in Uttar Pradesh
Hydroelectric power stations in Uttarakhand
20th-century architecture in India